The Goa legislative assembly election was held on 3 March 2012, to select the 40 members of the Sixth Goa Legislative Assembly, as the term of Sixth Legislative Assembly ended on March 2012.

The result was announced on 6 March. The Bharatiya Janata Party-Maharashtrawadi Gomantak alliance defeated the incumbent Indian National Congress government in Goa led by Chief Minister Digambar Kamat with 24 seats in the 40-seat assembly. The Bharatiya Janata Party won 21 seats, while the Maharashtrawadi Gomantak Party won 3 seats. The MLA with the biggest margin of victory was the incumbent MLA Frances D'Souza of the Bharatiya Janata Party (BJP). Former chief minister Manohar Parrikar was sworn in as the new chief minister on 9 March.

Timetable
The timetable of the electoral events are:

Parties
The Indian National Congress (INC), Nationalist Congress Party (NCP), All India Trinamool Congress (AITC) and the Bharatiya Janata Party (BJP) are the national political parties in the fray. Other regional parties include the Maharashtrawadi Gomantak, Goa Vikas Party, United Goans Democratic Party and Go Su-raj Party.

Issues
The issue of the cultural identity of Goa has also come to the fore in the past few years. The population of Goa has rapidly swelled due to increasing migration levels from neighboring Karnataka and Maharashtra, as well as from further afield such as Uttar Pradesh and Bihar.

Corruption
Following the 2011 Indian anti-corruption movement several allegations of corruption have been made on the incumbent government going to elections this year.

Nepotism was also an issue. Former CM and current head of the Goa TMC Wilfred de Souza accused the INC of perpetrating a "Family Raj" in its allotment of tickets for the election to relatives of INC leaders from such families as the Naiks, Alemaos, Ranes, and Monserrates. He also cited the denial of an electoral ticket to his son-in-law Tulio D’Souza in Saligao Assembly constituency despite the INC also denying him a ticket.

He also criticized the inability of incumbent CM Digambar Kamat to have stopped illegal mining while he was the minister of mining and finance minister in the previous government. He cited a report by a commission led by Justice M. B. Shah to investigate illegal mining in the country that suggested potential revenue of US$423 million was lost through illegal ore exports after he said he had seen a "leaked" version of the report.

Results

|-
! scope="col" style="background-color:#E9E9E9;text-align:left;" |Party
! scope="col" style="background-color:#E9E9E9;text-align:right;" |Seats contested
! scope="col" style="background-color:#E9E9E9;text-align:right;" |Seats won
! scope="col" style="background-color:#E9E9E9;text-align:right;" |Seat change
! scope="col" style="background-color:#E9E9E9;text-align:right;" |Vote share
|- style="background: #90EE90;"
! scope="row" style="text-align:left;" |Bhartiya Janata Party
| 28
| 21
|  7
| 34.68%
|- style="background: #90EE90;"
! scope="row" style="text-align:left;" |Maharashtrawadi Gomantak
| 7
| 3
|  1
| 6.72%
|-
! scope="row" style="text-align:left;" |Indian National Congress
| 34
| 9
|  7
| 30.78%
|-
! scope="row" style="text-align:left;" |Nationalist Congress Party 
| 6 
| 0
|  3
| 4.08%
|-
! scope="row" style="text-align:left;" |United Goans Democratic Party 
| 7 
| 0
|  1
| 1.17%
|-
! scope="row" style="text-align:left;" |Goa Vikas Party 
| 9
| 2
|  2
| 3.5%
|-
! scope="row" style="text-align:left;" |Save Goa Front 
| 0 
| 0
|  2
| 0%
|-
! scope="row" style="text-align:left;" |Independents 
| 72
| 5
|  3
| 16.67%
|- style="background-color:#E9E9E9; font-weight:bold"
! scope="row" style="text-align:left;" |Total
| 
| 40
| 
| 
|}

The following is the list of winning MLAs in the election.

By-election
Shortly after the election, the Cortalim seat was opened for a by-election following the death of the incumbent, Matanhy Saldanha, as a result of a heart attack. His wife, Alina Saldanha, was originally scheduled to run against Raymond D’Sa of the INC and independent candidate Ramakant Borkar, though the latter two soon withdrew from the race and she was elected unopposed on 25 May. She was given her husband's ministerial portfolio as forest minister. She immediately said that she would not allow mining on forest land.

Analysis
The Daily Pioneer called this election "the first time that the BJP has stamped its success in so many of those constituencies that have a significant population of the minority community."

References

External links
Goa Election Commission 

2012 State Assembly elections in India
State Assembly elections in Goa
2010s in Goa
March 2012 events in India